The Vilovataya is a river in the Murmansk region of Russia. It flows through Tersky District of Murmansk Oblast. It is a tributary of the Vyala.

Originating in Small Lambina lake, the river flows through the forest and marshland. There are no settlements on the river.

According to the Russian state registry of water, it belongs to the "Barents and White Sea basin district".

References

Rivers of Murmansk Oblast